KTIS-FM (98.5 FM) is a contemporary Christian music formatted radio station located in Minneapolis, Minnesota owned and operated by Northwestern Media, a ministry of the University of Northwestern - St. Paul. The station's studios are located on Snelling Avenue in Roseville (which is next to St. Paul), while its transmitter is located on the KMSP Tower in Shoreview.

KTIS is a non-profit radio station, receiving most of its donations and contributions from its listeners. The station is also aired on low-powered translators outside its main listening area. The station's programming is also streamed on the Internet.

KTIS hosts many different service projects and activities with which to better the community, such as the "Drive-thru Difference" and the web application PrayerWorks, which lets users submit prayer requests to be viewed by other users.  The other users can then send a notification to the person who first submitted the request, letting them know that their prayer has been prayed.

KTIS-HD3
KTIS-HD3 is branded as "Legacy HD3," which provides a traditional Inspirational music format. There are short features at the top of every hour, including a 3-minute news package from SRN News, as well as a Good News Verse of the day.

KTIS-HD4
KTIS-HD4 is "The Mel," a student-operated station from University of Northwestern's Broadcasting Department. The station features eclectic music and clips from popular preachers and podcasts, as well as other features from the students of Northwestern.

Translators

References

External links
KTIS-FM official website
 University of Northwestern

Christian radio stations in Minnesota
Radio stations in Minneapolis–Saint Paul
Radio stations established in 1949
1949 establishments in Minnesota
Northwestern Media